The 2018 Coupe de France Final was a football match between Les Herbiers VF and Paris Saint-Germain to decide the winner of the 2017–18 Coupe de France, the 101st season of the Coupe de France.

Paris Saint-Germain won the final 2–0 for their 4th consecutive and 12th overall Coupe de France title.

Background
The final was Les Herbiers' first. They upset many higher-level teams, such as Lens; however, they did not play any top-level teams en route to the final. Les Herbiers were the third team from the third division of French football to reach the final, after Nîmes, in 1996, and US Quevilly, in 2012. Both of these teams lost their matches, to Auxerre and Lyon respectively.

Meanwhile, Paris Saint-Germain were the three-time defending champion, having been to 15 finals and winning 11. They defeated Angers 1–0 in the 2017 final.

Route to the final

Note: H = home fixture, A = away fixture

Match

Details

References

Coupe De France Final 2018
Coupe De France Final 2018
2018
Coupe De France Final
Final
Coupe De France Final 2018
Coupe De France Final